Wendell Nogueira de Araújo (born 4 April 1989), simply known as Wendell, is a Brazilian footballer who plays for Atlético–ES as a midfielder.

Career statistics

References

External links

1989 births
Living people
Brazilian footballers
Association football midfielders
Campeonato Brasileiro Série B players
Campeonato Brasileiro Série C players
Campeonato Brasileiro Série D players
Rio Claro Futebol Clube players
Associação Desportiva São Caetano players
Clube Atlético Joseense players
Footballers from São Paulo